A by-election was held in the UK parliament constituency of Bromley and Chislehurst in London, following the death of Conservative Member of Parliament Eric Forth on 17 May 2006. The writ for the electing of a new member was issued on 6 June for a polling day of 29 June 2006, the same day as the Blaenau Gwent by-elections. The Conservatives held the seat but with their majority much reduced by the Liberal Democrats.

Labour, who stood future Shadow Chancellor of the Exchequer Rachel Reeves, was pushed into fourth place by the UK Independence Party. This was only the second time Labour had fallen to fourth place in an English by-election since World War II, the 1989 Richmond (Yorks) by-election being the other occasion. Labour would later drop to 5th place at the 2008 Henley by-election.

Candidates
On 3 June 2006, the local Conservative Association selected Bob Neill, the London Assembly Member for Bexley and Bromley and leader of the Conservative group in the Assembly. The Liberal Democrats selected London Borough of Bromley councillor Ben Abbotts. He is the Liberal Democrat environment spokesman on Bromley Council. Labour chose economist Rachel Reeves, runner-up in 2005, to stand once again.
The Green Party selected Ann Garrett as its candidate. Garrett stood as a Green Party candidate in the 2005 general election and the 2004 London Assembly elections.
The UK Independence Party selected Nigel Farage MEP, who represents South East England in the European Parliament.
 The Official Monster Raving Loony Party selected John Cartwright.

Two independent candidates were validly nominated: John Hemming-Clark and Nick Hadziannis. The English Democrats selected Steven Uncles and candidates from the Money Reform Party and the National Front also ran. The Money Reform Party was a minor political party.

As per the Senior Electoral Officer of Bromley Council, the electorate for this by-election was 72,206, an increase of 1.50% from the 2005 election.

2005 general election result

See also
 Bromley and Chislehurst constituency
 Lists of United Kingdom by-elections
 London Borough of Bromley

References

External links
Campaign literature from the by-election
Bromley & Chislehurst Conservatives 
Ben Abbotts & Bromley Liberal Democrats
Rachel Reeves - Labour Party
Bromley Green Party
John Hemming-Clark
Paul Winnett - National Front
Nick Hadziannis
Nigel Farage & UKIP Bromley & Chislehurst
Steven Uncles  -  English Democrats
Anne Belsey - Money Reform Party

Elections in the London Borough of Bromley
By-elections to the Parliament of the United Kingdom in London constituencies
Bromley and Chislehurst by-election
Bromley and Chislehurst by-election
Bromley and Chislehurst by-election